Gabal Sin Bishar (also called Jebel Sin Bishar or Mount Sin Bishar) is a mountain located in west-central Sinai. It was proposed to be the biblical Mount Sinai by Menashe Har-El, a biblical geographer at Tel Aviv University in his book The Sinai Journeys: The Route of the Exodus. This location was used for Zondervan's NIV Atlas of the Bible.

Proposed locations
Menashe Har-El examined the pros and cons of various theories on where Mount Sinai is located. These include:
 the southern Sinai peninsula (including the traditional location of Gabal Horeb)
 the northern Sinai peninsula
 the central Sinai peninsula
 the Suder valley in the west-central Sinai peninsula
 Midian and Edom.
All locations have proponents, but Gabal Horeb in the southern peninsula has been the traditional location since the 4th century AD (but notably not before). 

The Old Testament prophet Elijah, according to 1 Kings 19, is the last person recorded in the Bible as visiting Mount Sinai. The account of his visit does not give geographical details that help determine the actual location, but suggests the location was known long after the Jewish people left the mountain. Unfortunately, there are no surviving extra-biblical documents that mark the location. Whether the Second Temple's sacred books (given by Roman General Titus to Josephus) contained information on the location of Mount Sinai is unknown, but Josephus did write about the mountain. However, Dr. Har-El was a geologist and he discusses in detail the geographic and  environmental markers in Sinai, which do survive to the present day. He notes how they compare with the biblical account. 

Dr. Har-El gave nine main reasons why he believed the traditional location of Gabal Horeb (Gabal Musa) in southern Sinai was not Mount Sinai:

Gabal Sin Bishar & Suder Valley
Har-El believes the evidence supports Mount Sinai being located in the Suder Valley in the west-central Sinai Peninsula. His reasons include:

Other evidence
Dr. Har-El links Gabal Sin Bishar with a probable route the Jewish people took when fleeing Pharaoh across the Bitter Lakes, where Moses divided the Sea of Reeds. He also links Gabal Sin Bishar with the way stations and travel times the Jewish people took toward the Promised Land when they left Mount Sinai. Unfortunately, due to an Egyptian military presence near Gabal Sin Bishar, the ability of archeologists to further investigate this location is not an option.

References

Sin Bishar
Mount Sinai